Willhelm Schuldes (born 27 May 1968) is an Austrian football manager and former player. He is currently the Sporting director of SK Rapid Wien II

External links
 

1968 births
Living people
Austrian footballers
Austrian football managers
SV Horn players
Association football forwards
SV Horn managers